Doa dora is a moth of the Doidae family. It is found in Mexico, including Baja California and Guadalajara.

External links
Preliminary Assessment Of Lepidoptera Diversityon The Peninsula Of Baja California, Mexico,With A List Of Documented Species

Doidae
Moths described in 1894
Moths of Central America